Marion Hobby (born November 7, 1966 in Irondale, Alabama) is an American football coach who is the defensive line coach for the Cincinnati Bengals of the National Football League (NFL).

Playing career
Hobby played college football at the University of Tennessee under head coach Johnny Majors.  While at Tennessee he was a three-year starter and a First-team All-SEC pick in 1989.  He was also named to Tennessee's 100th anniversary team.  He was drafted in the third-round of 1990 NFL Draft with the 74th overall pick by the Minnesota Vikings.  The Vikings traded him to the New England Patriots, where he played for three seasons.

Coaching career
Hobby started coaching 1995 at the University of Tennessee-Martin as a strength and conditioning coach. Over the next few years he coached with Louisiana-Lafayette, and Tennessee. He spent five seasons as the defensive line coach for Ole Miss between 1999 and 2004.  Hobby coached the defensive ends for the Clemson Tigers for the 2005 season before spending the next two seasons with the New Orleans Saints the same position. He would serve as the Duke assistant head coach, defensive coordinator, and defensive line coach under head coach David Cutcliffe for three seasons before he made a return to Clemson. He served as co-defensive coordinator and defensive ends coach from 2011 to 2016 under head coach Dabo Swinney, where he won a national championship in 2016. In January 2017, the Jacksonville Jaguars hired Marion Hobby as defensive line coach.

On February 8, 2019, the Miami Dolphins announced Hobby as their defensive line coach. He missed the team's weeks 9 and 10 games against the Arizona Cardinals and Los Angeles Chargers on November 8 and November 15, 2020, in accordance with COVID-19 protocols. On January 7, 2021, the Dolphins announced that Hobby and the team had mutually agreed to part ways.

On January 16, 2021, the Cincinnati Bengals announced that Hobby named as their defensive line coach.

Personal life
Hobby graduated with a bachelor's degree from University of Tennessee in 1995.  He and his wife Constance have three daughters, Maria, Mariah, and Camille.

References

External links
Clemson Tigers official biography
Duke Blue Devils official biography
Jacksonville Jaguars biography

1966 births
Living people
African-American coaches of American football
African-American players of American football
American football defensive ends
Clemson Tigers football coaches
Duke Blue Devils football coaches
Jacksonville Jaguars coaches
Louisiana Ragin' Cajuns football coaches
Miami Dolphins coaches
New England Patriots players
New Orleans Saints coaches
Ole Miss Rebels football coaches
People from Irondale, Alabama
Players of American football from Alabama
Tennessee Volunteers football coaches
Tennessee Volunteers football players
UT Martin Skyhawks football coaches
21st-century African-American people
20th-century African-American sportspeople
Cincinnati Bengals coaches